Nathan "Nat" Bentham (8 March 1900 - 1975) was an English professional rugby league footballer who played in the 1920s and 1930s.

Club career
Bentham started his career at Wigan Highfield. Due to the club's financial problems, he was transferred to Halifax during November 1928. He was transferred to Warrington for a fee of £400 during January 1930.

International honours
Nat Bentham won caps for England while at Wigan Highfield in 1928 against Wales (2 matches), while at Halifax in 1929 against Other Nationalities, while at Warrington in 1930 against Other Nationalities (2 matches), and won caps for Great Britain while at Wigan Highfield in 1928 against Australia (3 matches), and New Zealand (3 matches), while at Halifax in 1929-30 against Australia (2 matches), and while at Warrington against Australia (2 matches).

Bentham was the only Great Britain player to retain his position for every game of the unprecedented 4-test Ashes series of the 1929–30 Kangaroo tour of Great Britain.

References

External links
Statistics at wolvesplayers.thisiswarrington.co.uk

1900 births
1975 deaths
England national rugby league team players
English rugby league players
Great Britain national rugby league team players
Halifax R.L.F.C. players
Liverpool City (rugby league) players
Rugby league hookers
Rugby league players from Wigan
Warrington Wolves players